Re A (conjoined twins) [2001] 2 WLR 480 is a Court of Appeal decision on the separation of conjoined twins. The case raised legal and ethical dilemmas. It was ruled it would be permissible to sever and thus kill in a palliative, sympathetic manner the weaker twin to save the much stronger one. The case was among those where it would be lawful to conduct surgery against the wishes of the parents. The parents' faith was held not to be overriding, nor general applicability of the outcome to all such cases.

Facts
Rosie and Gracie Attard, who were born on 8 August 2000, were conjoined twins who were joined at the abdomen. During legal deliberations, they were given the public pseudonyms "Mary" and "Jodie", respectively. The medical evidence showed that Gracie was the stronger sibling, sustaining the life of Rosie; Rosie had survived birth due to a shared common artery supplied by Gracie. If surgically separated, Gracie had a 94% survival rate with little margin of error, but Rosie was guaranteed to die. If left conjoined, then their life expectancy—fast deteriorating—would be, with a low margin of error, six months.

Reasons of judgment and appeal decision
At first instance, Justice Johnson was left to decide the case without any direct precedents to bind or guide him. He relied primarily on Airedale NHS Trust v Bland where it was declared acceptable to remove life support. He ruled separation would not be murder but a case of "passive euthanasia" in which food and hydration would be withdrawn.

The Court of Appeal agreed in outcome but rejected this analysis. The three appellate judges gave contrasting legal reasoning. Lord Justice Alan Ward invoked the concept of self-defence suggesting that "If [Gracie] could speak she would surely protest, Stop it, [Rosie], you're killing me." Lord Justice Brooke relied upon R v Dudley and Stephens and invoked necessity as a defence. Lord Justice Robert Walker focused upon the morally understandable intention of the surgeons, and the great body of profession opinion, in concluding that surgery could go ahead.

Result
The 20-hour-long operation to separate the twins took place on 7 November 2000. As expected, Gracie survived the operation and Rosie died. Rosie's remains were later buried on the Maltese island of Gozo.

In 2014, when Gracie was 14 years old, she was living a reasonably normal life, had a younger sister, and was thinking about studying to become a physician.

See also
Necessity in English law

References

External links
Text of the judgement in this case, and the refusal of leave to appeal, from BAILII.
Court of Appeal judgment

English criminal case law
Conjoined twins
Court of Appeal (England and Wales) cases
Medical law
Medical controversies in the United Kingdom
2000 in case law
2000 in British law
English tort case law